Memories and Dreams is a 1993 feature documentary film about actress Johanna Kilma-Ocenaskova, directed by Lynn-Maree Milburn. Part fairytale and part drama, the film tells a tale of loss and renewal in which romantic love is but one of many passions. Set almost entirely in Prague, it chronicles the life of Czech born actress Johanna Kilma-Ocenaskova, from a childhood of freedom and fantasy to the unexpected horrors of World War II and her eventual escape to Australia. The film relays her experience not only as a series of disconnected events, but a metaphysical exploration of the nature of personal memory. Every single frame is re-photographed, tinted or hand-painted. The film was developed from an original idea by director, Lynn-Maree Milburn.

Festivals and awards 
 Hot Docs - Canadian International Documentary Festival (2000)
 Australian Film Week - Ireland (1996)
 Yamagata International Documentary Film Festival(1995)
 Australian Cinematographers Society Awards National (1995)
 Aurora Australis: New Independent Film from Australia (1995)
 Würzburg Film Festival (1994)
 Telluride Film Festival(1994)
 International Film Festival Rotterdam (1994)
 Mediawave International Festival of Visual Arts (1994)
 Ljubljana International Film Festival (1994)
 Laboratorio Immagine Donna (1994)
 Hong Kong International Film Festival (1994)
 Dublin Film Festival (1994)
 Creteil Film Des Femmes Festival (1994)
 Cologne Film Festival (1994)
 Brussels International Festival of Cartoons and Animated Films Dessin Anime (1994)
 Berkley Women's Film Festival (1994)
 The International Animation Festival (1994)
 Venice International Film Festival (1993)
 Toronto International Film Festival (1993)
 Melbourne International Film Festival (1993)
 London Film Festival (1993)
 Leipzig International Festival of Documentary and Animation Films (1993)
 Australian Film Institute (1993)

External links 
 
 The Screen Guide at Screen Australia 

1993 films
Films directed by Lynn-Maree Milburn